Meri Saheli Meri Humjoli (English: My friend my peer) is a 2012 Pakistani television series aired on Urdu 1. Stars are Anoushay Abbasi, Neelam Muneer, Lubna Aslam, Hasan Ahmed, Farhan Ali Agha and Kanwar Arsalan.

Plot 
Story of two best friends, Ehasas (Neelam Muneer) and Wafa (Anoushay Abbasi). For Ehsas, money is everything and for Wafa, Love is above all. They pay a heavy price for chasing their dreams and getting what was never destined for them.

Cast 
Anoushay Abbasi as Wafa
Neelam Muneer as Ehasas
Farhan Ali Agha
Kanwar Arsalan
Ubaida Ansari as Sabiha
Hasan Ahmed
Faizan Khawaja
Lubna Aslam
Ali Afzal
Hajra
Mehak Ali

Awards and nominations

References

External links 
 

Urdu-language television shows
2012 Pakistani television series debuts
Pakistani drama television series
Urdu 1 original programming